John Frederick "Rick" Jardine  (born December 6, 1951 in Belleville, Canada) is a Canadian mathematician working in the fields of homotopy theory, category theory, and number theory.

Biography 
Jardine obtained his Ph.D. from the University of British Columbia in 1981, with thesis Algebraic Homotopy written under the direction of Roy Douglas. Following a research fellowship at the University of Toronto and a Dickson instructorship at the University of Chicago, he joined the Department of Mathematics at the University of Western Ontario in 1984, where he is currently an emeritus professor.

From 2002 to 2016, Jardine held a Canada Research Chair in applied homotopy theory. Since 2008, he is fellow of the Fields Institute, and has been recognized with the Coxeter–James Prize in 1992 by the Canadian Mathematical Society. In 2018 the Canadian Mathematical Society listed him in their inaugural class of fellows.

Work
Jardine is known for his work on model category structures on simplicial presheaves.

References

External references
 Jardine's homepage at the University of Western Ontario

1951 births
Living people
People from Belleville, Ontario
20th-century  Canadian mathematicians
21st-century  Canadian mathematicians
Topologists
University of British Columbia alumni
University of Chicago people
Academic staff of the University of Western Ontario
Fellows of the Canadian Mathematical Society